The Bourbonnaise is a French breed of chicken.

It is included on the Slow Food Foundation Ark of Taste.

Description
The breed is a good farm bird, both a good layer (up to 200 eggs per year) and a good source of meat.

The essential characteristic of Bourbonnaise is its high productivity. In addition, it is very vigorous, knows how to feed and defend itself. The breed acclimates to most conditions. Although preferring to be kept free-range, the breed can be raised in a chicken coop without a problem.

Well-nourished young grow quickly and reach adulthood by six months.

Origin
This hen is from the province of Bourbonnais, where white poultry, like the original Gâtinaise breed, have been raised for a very long time. Crosses between these and Brahmas made it possible to obtain a race called Bourbonnaise herminée, the white ones kept the name of Gâtinaises.

References 

Chicken breeds
Chicken breeds originating in France